The men's high jump, also known as the running high jump to distinguish it from the standing high jump, was a track and field athletics event held as part of the Athletics at the 1912 Summer Olympics programme. It was the fifth appearance of the event, which is one of 12 to have been held at every Summer Olympics. The competition was held on July 7, 1912, and on July 8, 1912. Thirty-seven high jumpers from ten nations competed. NOCs could enter up to 12 athletes. The event was won by Alma Richards of the United States, the nation's fifth consecutive victory in the men's high jump. Germany won its second silver medal in the event, after 1904.

Background

This was the fifth appearance of the event, which is one of 12 athletics events to have been held at every Summer Olympics. Returning jumpers from the 1908 Games were silver medalist Géo André of France and Otto Monsen of Norway, who had refused to participate in a re-jump after a successful protest and therefore had no mark in 1908. The Americans were favored, with recent world record breaker George Horine atop a strong (and, as allowed at the time, large) team. Egon Erickson and Alma Richards were also strong contenders; the three men had each won one of the three regional Olympic trials. Jim Thorpe was among the Americans; he won the pentathlon (which did not include a high jump) on the same day as the qualifying round and the decathlon (which did) a week later.

Chile and Italy each made their debut in the event. The United States appeared for the fifth time, having competed at each edition of the Olympic men's high jump to that point.

Competition format

For the first time, there were two distinct rounds of jumping with results cleared between rounds (the 1908 Games had featured a two-round event but the results from the qualifying round then carried over to the final). All jumpers clearing 1.83 metres in the qualifying round advanced to the final.

Records

These were the standing world and Olympic records (in metres) prior to the 1912 Summer Olympics.

At first Hans Liesche set a new Olympic record with 1.91 metres. But Alma Richards was able to equalize this mark, when he also jumped 1.91 metres. Finally Alma Richards set a new Olympic record with 1.93 metres.

Schedule

Results

Qualifying

Brauer is listed in some sources as having competed and having cleared 1.60 metres (which would put him in the tie for 28th), but other sources make clear he did not start.

Final

References

Sources
 
 

Athletics at the 1912 Summer Olympics
High jump at the Olympics